The women's 4×100 metre freestyle relay event at the 1952 Olympic Games took place on 30 July and 1 August at the Swimming Stadium. This swimming event used freestyle as a relay, with swimmers typically using the front crawl. Because an Olympic size swimming pool is 50 metres long, each of the four swimmers completed two lengths of the pool. The first swimmer had to touch the wall before the second could leave the starting block; timing of the starts was thus important.

Medalists

Results

Heats

Heat One

Heat Two

Final

References

Swimming at the 1952 Summer Olympics
4 × 100 metre freestyle relay
1952 in women's swimming
Women's events at the 1952 Summer Olympics